Angle Vale is a semi-rural town on the Adelaide Plains between Gawler and Virginia in South Australia. It is steadily being surrounded by Adelaide's suburban sprawl. It is close to many vineyards and farms. The town includes Trinity College's Gawler River campus, and Angle Vale Primary School, but no secondary school. Many students travel to nearby towns or to Gawler.

Angle Vale Post Office opened on 1 October 1866. A Foodland supermarket opened in 2007, along with an assortment of other new stores, replacing an older shopping area. Part of this shopping area remains as a fruits and vegetables store.

The laminated timber arch Angle Vale Bridge was constructed over the Gawler River in 1876, and is one of the oldest surviving bridges of its type. It is located just north of the centre of town.

The former Carclew Primitive Methodist church and cemetery are sometimes identified as being at Angle Vale, but they are officially in neighbouring Penfield Gardens.

References

Towns in South Australia
Adelaide Plains
Suburbs of Adelaide